The Encampment River is a  tributary of the North Platte River. The river's source is east of Buck Mountain in the Park Range of Jackson County, Colorado. The river flows north and passes to the east of the town of Encampment, Wyoming, then through the town of Riverside, Wyoming before its confluence with the North Platte.

See also
List of rivers of Colorado
List of rivers of Wyoming

References

Rivers of Wyoming
Rivers of Colorado
Tributaries of the North Platte River
Rivers of Jackson County, Colorado
Rivers of Carbon County, Wyoming